Jean-Noël Huck (born December 20, 1948 in Mutzig, Bas-Rhin) is a French former professional football (soccer) player and manager.

He is the father of another footballer, William Huck.

External links
Profile at FFF
Profile

1948 births
Living people
Sportspeople from Bas-Rhin
French people of German descent
French footballers
France international footballers
RC Strasbourg Alsace players
OGC Nice players
Paris FC players
Paris Saint-Germain F.C. players
FC Mulhouse players
En Avant Guingamp players
Ligue 1 players
French football managers
RC Strasbourg Alsace managers
En Avant Guingamp managers
OGC Nice managers

Association football midfielders
Footballers from Alsace